The 2014–15 season was Genoa Cricket and Football Club's eighth consecutive season in Serie A following the club's promotion from Serie B at the end of the 2006–07 season. The team competed in Serie A, finishing 6th, and in the Coppa Italia, where the club was eliminated in the fourth round.

Players

Squad information

Competitions

Serie A

League table

Results summary

Results by round

Matches

Coppa Italia

Statistics

Appearances and goals

|-
! colspan="10" style="background:#dcdcdc; text-align:center"| Goalkeepers

|-
! colspan="10" style="background:#dcdcdc; text-align:center"| Defenders

|-
! colspan="10" style="background:#dcdcdc; text-align:center"| Midfielders

|-
! colspan="10" style="background:#dcdcdc; text-align:center"| Forwards

|-
! colspan="10" style="background:#dcdcdc; text-align:center"| Players transferred out during the season

References

Genoa C.F.C. seasons
Genoa